The 2017 Brickyard 400 (branded as the Brantley Gilbert Big Machine Brickyard 400 for sponsorship reasons) is a Monster Energy NASCAR Cup Series race held on July 23, 2017 at Indianapolis Motor Speedway in Speedway, Indiana. It the 24th running of the Brickyard 400, Contested over 167 laps extended from 160 laps due to an overtime finish, on the  speedway, it was the 20th race of the 2017 Monster Energy NASCAR Cup Series season. This was Kasey Kahne's final win in NASCAR.

This marked the first Brickyard 400 without 5-time Brickyard 400 winner Jeff Gordon on the starting grid, and also the first not to feature 2-time Brickyard 400 winner Tony Stewart since the 1998 edition.

Also this marks the final Brickyard 400 start for Dale Earnhardt Jr.

Report

Background

The Indianapolis Motor Speedway, located in Speedway, Indiana, (an enclave suburb of Indianapolis) in the United States, is the home of the Indianapolis 500 and the Brickyard 400.

Constructed in 1909, it is the original speedway, the first racing facility so named. It has a permanent seating capacity estimated at 235,000 with infield seating raising capacity to an approximate 400,000. It is the highest-capacity sports venue in the world.

Entry list

Practice

First practice

Final practice

Qualifying

Qualifying results

Race

First stage
Kyle Busch led the field to the green flag at 2:46 p.m. The first caution of the race flew when Corey LaJoie spun out and hit the wall in Turn 3. Minutes later, the race was red-flagged due to lightning in the area, as well as a downpour, that lasted 1 hour, 47 minutes and three seconds.

The race restarted on lap 18, The second caution flew on lap 31 for a scheduled competition caution. During that 13-lap run, Chase Elliott retired from the race with a failed engine.

The race restarted on lap 35, it went green the remainder of the first stage, ending on lap 51, which was won by Busch. The third caution of the race flew to conclude stage one.

Second stage
The race restarted on lap 56, Caution flew two laps later for a three-car wreck in Turn 1. It started when J. J. Yeley spun exiting Turn 1. David Ragan spun exiting Turn 1, veered down the track and slammed the inside wall. Jeffrey Earnhardt was also collected.

The race restarted on lap 64, only for debris from Yeley's car to bring out the fifth caution of the race, on lap 72. Erik Jones took the lead when Busch committed to pit road.

The race restarted on lap 76, Dale Earnhardt Jr. and Trevor Bayne made contact, and Earnhardt's car suffered radiator damage that resulted in the sixth caution of the race one lap later.

The race restarted on lap 80, Ryan Blaney took the lead from Jones going into Turn 1. Busch retook the lead on Lap 87 and won the second stage. That would bring out the seventh caution to conclude the stage. Martin Truex Jr. exited pit road with the race lead.

Final stage

The final stage began under green on lap 106. Ricky Stenhouse Jr. and Jimmie Johnson made contact exiting Turn 2 two laps later, sending Stenhouse down the track and into the inside wall, therefore bringing out an eighth caution.

The race restarted under green on lap 111, Truex got loose going into Turn 1, got into the left-rear corner of Busch, sending him spinning into the wall, therefore bringing out the ninth caution of the race. Truex got swept around by side force and slammed the wall, and his car caught fire. Both cars were out of the race, denying Kyle Busch's shot at a third consecutive victory at the Brickyard 400. This incident handed the race lead to Matt Kenseth.

The race restarted under green with 40 laps to go. Drivers started hitting pit road to make their final stop of the race with 31 to go. Kenseth pitted from the lead with 28 to go and Jones pitted the next lap, handing the lead to Brad Keselowski.

In the closing laps, the first three cars, Keselowski, Johnson and Kasey Kahne, chose to gamble on fuel, but probably couldn't make it to the finish on fuel if there were no more cautions. Fourth place Trevor Bayne was the highest placed car with enough fuel to make it to the end. This all went out the window with 11 to go when Clint Bowyer got loose and spun down the track, with help from Jones, slammed the inside wall and ricocheted back onto the racing surface into the path of Kurt Busch, who t-boned him, slammed the wall and came to a halt down the track, the tenth caution of the race flew for a multi-car wreck, Kahne pitted from third just as the wreck happened, which proved crucial for him as he inherited the lead. The race was red-flagged for the second time to ensue cleanup on the track, It was lifted after 20 minutes and 20 seconds.

Kahne held off Keselowski's charge into Turn 1 on the restart when the race went back to green with seven laps to go. When the field came back down the front stretch, Kyle Larson slammed the outside wall, bringing out the 11th caution.

The race restarted with two laps to go, Kahne and Keselowski raced side-by-side from the start/finish line through Turn 3. Heading down the backstretch, Johnson, with smoke billowing from his left-rear tire, got to the inside of the two to battle for the lead going into Turn 3, setting up the 12th caution of the race; rounding the turn, Johnson spun out and hit the outside wall, sending the race into overtime.

Overtime

First attempt
On the first attempt, the field didn't make it to the start/finish line before all the pushing and shoving caused a multi-car wreck, bringing out the 13th caution. Keselowski was ahead of Kahne when the caution flew and assumed the lead, The red flag was displayed for the third time to again ensue cleanup of the track, The red flag was lifted after 24 minutes and 16 seconds.

Second attempt
At 8:53 PM, the second attempt at finishing the race began.  Kahne got the advantage, jumped past Keselowski going into Turn 1 and set sail. Exiting Turn 2, Denny Hamlin suffered a left-rear tire failure and spun towards the outside wall, getting clipped by Paul Menard in the process. The caution was not called at the time.  Despite this wreck happening well before Kahne, the race leader, reached the pre-determined mark on the backstretch that designated an official restart under NASCAR's green-white-checker finish rule that allowed NASCAR to end the race under caution, officials waited until he passed the line, then threw the caution to end the race. This ended the race and secured victory for Kahne.

Controversy came as a result of this finish, primarily over darkness issues.  Because of the rain delay early in the race, and numerous cautions in the final stage, including two red flags, it was 8:54 PM, with official sunset at 9:05 PM.  The track does not have lights.  Some drivers asked if safety vehicles could turn on their headlights before the final restart (which was denied).  Furthermore, after the incident, NASCAR found oil as a result of the incident, and questions arose if the track could have been cleaned up in time or the race would have been stopped for darkness with less than ten minutes of daylight available;  at the November 2015 Martinsville race, the checkered flag waved at 5:23 PM, less than a minute before sunset.

NASCAR subsequently made a rule change eliminating the overtime line, and reverting to the 2010-15 green-white-checker rule with one change, eliminating the maximum number of attempts.

Race results

Stage results

Stage 1
Laps: 50

Stage 2
Laps: 50

Final stage results

Stage 3
Laps: 67

Race statistics
 Lead changes: 7 among different drivers
 Cautions/Laps: 14 for 55
 Red flags: 3 for 2 hours, 31 minutes and 39 seconds
 Time of race: 3 hours, 39 minutes and 0 seconds
 Average speed:

Media

Television
NBC Sports covered the race on the television side. Rick Allen, Jeff Burton and Steve Letarte had the call in the booth for the race. Dave Burns, Parker Kligerman, Marty Snider and Kelli Stavast reported from pit lane during the race.

Radio
Indianapolis Motor Speedway Radio Network and the Performance Racing Network jointly co-produced the radio broadcast for the race, which was simulcast on Sirius XM NASCAR Radio, and aired on IMS or PRN stations, depending on contractual obligations.  The lead announcers and two pit reporters were PRN staff, while the turns and two pit reporters were from IMS.

Standings after the race

Drivers' Championship standings

Manufacturers' Championship standings

Note: Only the first 16 positions are included for the driver standings.
. – Driver has clinched a position in the Monster Energy NASCAR Cup Series playoffs.

References

2017 Brickyard 400
2017 Monster Energy NASCAR Cup Series
2017 in sports in Indiana
July 2017 sports events in the United States